"Bimbo Nation" is the second single from TV Rock's debut album Sunshine City.

Track listing
Australian CD single
"Bimbo Nation" (TV Rock Radio Mix - Clean Version) – 3:14
"Bimbo Nation" (TV Rock Radio Mix - Dirty Version) – 3:13
"Bimbo Nation" (TV Rock Mainroom Mix) – 6:28
"Bimbo Nation" (Tonite Only's Fuck Tomorrow Vocal Mix) – 7:04
"Bimbo Nation" (Dirty South Mix) – 7:17

Chart history
"Bimbo Nation" debuted at number 38 on the Australian ARIA singles chart on 16 October 2006, before climbing to 32.

"Bimbo Nation" stayed in the Top 50 of the Australian charts for 7 consecutive weeks.

References

2006 singles
2006 songs